Stenodema laevigatum, or sometimes Stenodema laevigata (also called Grass bug), is a species of bug from Miridae family. The species have a gray to brown elongated body, with the eyes located backwards in the head. Sometimes they might come in green colour. They are common in the United Kingdom, and throughout the rest of Europe. then east across the Palearctic through Asia Minor and the Caucasus to northern China.

Description 
The species are of light-green colour, but can come in yellow or brown. The species lacks femoral spurs, and have densely pitted prothorax.

Ecology 

The larvae is light yellowish and is born in summer, with adults taking over by August. Adults and larvae are both feeding on unripe grains, which includes: Alopecurus, Dactylis, Festuca and wheat. Sometimes, larvae might suck juices from leaves and stems. They start to eat grass seeds and flowers by later development. The larvae hibernates in winter, by living in a soil, and leaf litter. Both males and females mate in spring, with the males being greener than females. The larvae is active from May–July, after which the new generation appears, which will last till next spring.

Camouflage
By autumn, the species turn brown, and start their overwintering. As soon as spring starts, their colour is changes to green, which camouflages them under a grass colour.

References

Bugs described in 1758
Taxa named by Carl Linnaeus
Hemiptera of Europe
Stenodemini